James "Shem" Downey (5 January 1922 – 22 December 2013) was an Irish hurler who played as a midfielder for the Kilkenny senior team.

Born in Conahy, County Kilkenny, Downey first arrived on the inter-county scene at the age of seventeen when he first linked up with the Kilkenny minor team. He made his senior debut in the 1946 championship. Downey went on to play a key part for Kilkenny over the following eight years, and won one All-Ireland medal and three Leinster medals.  He was an All-Ireland runner-up on two occasions.

Downey was a member of the Leinster inter-provincial team on a number of occasions throughout his career, however, he never won a Railway Cup medal. At club level he won one championship medal with Tullaroan.

His retirement came following Kilkenny's defeat by Wexford in the 1954 championship.

Downey's daughters, Angela and Ann, are regarded as two of the greatest camogie players of all-time, and won twelve All-Ireland medals with Kilkenny.

Honours

Team

Tullaroan
Kilkenny Senior Hurling Championship (1): 1948

Kilkenny
All-Ireland Senior Hurling Championship (1): 1947
Leinster Senior Hurling Championship (7): 1947, 1950, 1953
Leinster Minor Hurling Championship (1): 1939

References

1922 births
2013 deaths
Tullaroan hurlers
Kilkenny inter-county hurlers
Leinster inter-provincial hurlers
All-Ireland Senior Hurling Championship winners